The 2010 British Columbia Scotties Tournament of Hearts, British Columbia's women's provincial curling championship, was held January 4-10 at the Penticton Curling Club in Penticton. The winner represents team British Columbia at the 2010 Scotties Tournament of Hearts in Sault Ste. Marie, Ontario.

Teams

Standings

Results

Draw 1
January 4, 12:00 PM

Draw 2
January 4, 7:30 PM

Draw 3
January 5, 12:00 PM

Draw 4
January 5, 7:00 PM

Draw 5
January 6, 12:00 PM

Draw 6
January 6, 7:00 PM

Draw 7
January 7, 12:00 PM

Draw 8
January 7, 7:00 PM

Draw 9
January 8, 9:30 AM

Playoffs

1 vs. 2
January 8, 7:00 PM

3 vs. 4
January 9, 9:30 AM

Semifinal
January 9, 5:00 PM

Final
January 10, 2:00 PM

References

External links
Official site

British Columbia
Scotties Tournament of Hearts
British Columbia Scotties Tournament of Hearts
Sport in Penticton
Curling in British Columbia